In computer science Language Of Temporal Ordering Specification (LOTOS) is a formal specification language based on temporal ordering of events. LOTOS is used for communications protocol specification in International Organization for Standardization (ISO) Open Systems Interconnection model (OSI) standards.

LOTOS is an algebraic language that consists of two parts: a part for the description of data and operations, based on abstract data types, and a part for the description of concurrent processes, based on process calculus.

Work on the standard was completed in 1988, and it was published as ISO 8807 in 1989. Between 1993 and 2001, an ISO committee worked to define a revised version of the LOTOS standard, which was published in 2001 as E-LOTOS.

See also
 Formal methods
 List of ISO standards
 CADP
 E-LOTOS
 Process calculus

References

 ISO/IEC international standard 8807:1989. Information Processing Systems - Open Systems Interconnection - LOTOS: A Formal Description Technique based on the Temporal Ordering of Observational Behaviour. Geneva, September 1989.
 The Formal Description Technique LOTOS, P.H.J. van Eijk et al., editors, North-Holland, 1989.
 LOTOSphere: Software Development with LOTOS, Tommaso Bolognesi, Jeroen van de Lagemaat, and Chris Vissers, editors, Kluwer Academic Publishers, 1995.
 Hubert Garavel, Frédéric Lang, and Wendelin Serwe, From LOTOS to LNT. In Joost-Pieter Katoen, Rom Langerak, and Arend Rensink, editors, ModelEd, TestEd, TrustEd - Essays Dedicated to Ed Brinksma on the Occasion of His 60th Birthday, vol. 10500 of Lecture Notes in Computer Science, pages 3–26, Springer International Publishing, October 2017, doi 10.1007/978-3-319-68270-9_1.

External links

World-wide Environment for Learning LOTOS (WELL)
Tutorials for LOTOS (see section 3)
 LOTOS in the RKBExplorer

Process calculi
Formal methods
Formal specification languages
Concurrency (computer science)
Theoretical computer science
Concurrency control
Synchronization